Pivagabine (INN; brand name Tonerg), also known as N-pivaloyl-γ-aminobutyric acid or ''N''-pivaloyl-GABA, is an antidepressant and anxiolytic drug which was introduced in Italy in 1997 for the treatment of depressive and maladaptive syndromes. But it was discontinued in Italy (according to Martindale). Originally believed to function as a prodrug to GABA, pivagabine is now believed to act somehow via modulation of corticotropin-releasing factor (CRF).

See also
 Fengabine

References

Antidepressants
Carboxamides
Drugs with unknown mechanisms of action
GABA analogues